The Pushkin House, formally the Institute of Russian Literature, is a research institute in St. Petersburg. It is part of a network of institutions affiliated with the Russian Academy of Sciences.

History

Establishment 
The Russian Literature Institute began its life in December 1905 as the main centre for Alexander Pushkin studies in Imperial Russia. A commission in charge of erecting a Pushkin monument in St. Petersburg, led by Sergei Oldenburg and Aleksey Shakhmatov, suggested a permanent institution be set up to preserve original Pushkin manuscripts:

The idea won support from all sides and was welcomed by Grand Duke Constantine Constantinovich. It was understood that the Pushkin House would be housed in a purpose-built Neoclassical edifice, or Odeon, but the idea failed to materialize owing to lack of funds. 

In 1907 Vladimir Kokovtsov, Minister of Finance, came up with the proposal to acquire a huge collection of Pushkin manuscripts and memorabilia amassed in Paris by Alexander Onegin from 1879 onwards. The negotiations dragged on until Onegin's death in 1925, but the bulk of his collection eventually ended up in Russia. The most precious items had been presented to Onegin by Vasily Zhukovsky's son. The personal libraries and manuscripts of Ivan Krylov, Pyotr Pletnev, and Andrei Bolotov were acquired from their heirs soon afterward.

Soviet era

The Pushkin House was originally a non-governmental organization specializing in Pushkin studies, which have been recognized by Russian authorities as a separate branch of scholarly inquiry. The Russian Revolution led to the shutdown of all non-governmental institutions, but the Pushkin House was spared and put under the umbrella of the Russian Academy of Sciences (in 1918). Such "honorary" directors as Anatoly Lunacharsky, Lev Kamenev and Maksim Gorky ensured its safe passage through the hardships of the Revolution.

This entailed the extension of its scope to encompass all Russian classical writers of the 19th century. In 1920 the Pushkin House was renamed the Institute of New Russian Literature to reflect its new purpose. Its main object was to prepare highly authoritative "academic" editions of works by Pushkin, Mikhail Lermontov, Vissarion Belinsky, Ivan Turgenev, Nikolai Nekrasov, Fyodor Dostoevsky, and other writers of the previous century.

In 1927 Pushkin House moved from the crammed rooms in the Academy of Sciences building to the magnificent neo-Palladian Customs House, built after Giovanni Francesco Lucchini's designs in 1829–1832 and situated just around the Strelka. It was to the original Kunstkamera rooms that Alexander Blok referred in his last poem To Pushkin House, celebrating Pushkin's heritage as a gleam of hope during the chaos and confusion of the post-revolutionary years:

The Pushkin House remained open during the gruesome Siege of Leningrad, although most of the staff and manuscripts were evacuated to other cities. Following the war the institute continued as a prominent academic centre for Russian literature, employing such leading scholars as Boris Eikhenbaum and Dmitry Likhachov.

Structure
The collections of the Pushkin House, partly housed in a modern block hidden behind the Neoclassical facade, include numerous manuscripts from the 13th century onward, portraits and personal documents of leading Russian authors, as well as a galaxy of rare music recordings. The institution has a complex structure and is subdivided into several departments: 

 Department of Old Russian Literature
 Department of Russian Folklore and Records Archive
 Department of New Russian Literature
 Department of Pushkin Studies
 Department of Recent Russian Literature
 Correlation of Russian and Foreign Literature Department
 Bibliography and Sources Department
 Manuscript Division and Archive of Ancient Relics
 Museum of Literature

The Pushkin memorial houses in Mikhailovskoye, Trigorskoye, Tsarskoe Selo, and on the Moyka River are also affiliated with the Pushkin House.

Directors

References

External links 
 

Archives in Russia
Buildings and structures in Saint Petersburg
1905 establishments in the Russian Empire
Alexander Pushkin
Custom houses
Institutes of the Russian Academy of Sciences
Cultural heritage monuments of federal significance in Saint Petersburg